Loop is an unincorporated community and census-designated place (CDP) in Blair County, Pennsylvania, United States. It was first listed as a CDP prior to the 2020 census.

The CDP is in south-central Blair County, in the western part of Frankstown Township and the east part of Blair Township. It is bordered to the northwest by the borough of Hollidaysburg. The Frankstown Branch of the Juniata River flows northeasterly through the center of the CDP. Loop sits at the base of the northern end of Loop Mountain, part of the Ridge-and-Valley Province of the Appalachian Mountains.

Demographics

References 

Census-designated places in Blair County, Pennsylvania
Census-designated places in Pennsylvania